Siong Leng Musical Association or Siong Leng is a Nanyin musical group from Singapore. Siong Leng is known for its contribution to preserve and promote Nanyin (or Nan Guan) and Liyuan Opera, the arts of Southern Min people.

History

The foundation of the group went back to 1901 when Heng Yun Association was formed to meet the cultural need of the local Hokkien community, and the earliest Nanyin performances were then organised by the association in Singapore (still part of Malaya at that time). Heng Yun association was founded by immigrants from Southern Fujian, China. While worked overseas to save money, some of them initiated to create entertainment to overcome their homesickness. Heng Yun association then became popular across Malaya. When Second Sino-Japanese War broke in 1937, Heng Yun participated in Fund Relief for China program initiated by Tan Kah Kee, but because Malaya is a neutral British colony, support to China was halted. Finally the group was disbanded. Some ex-member created new group called Yun Lu. The group's life was momentary. Some of the Yun Lu ex-member established new group in 1941 called Siong Leng Musical Association. However, when Japan occupied Singapore in 1942, all the activities were disrupted. Then, after war the group resumed. Musical performances were organised to celebrate festivities or charity events. A musician most renown for his contribution to Siong Leng during this time was Quanzhou born Teng Mah Seng (1915–1992). He composed many new Nanyin pieces and helped promoted Nanyin in Singapore. In 1970s he was appointed as chairman.

Through participation in various folk and traditional music festivals around the world, the group has won many awards and international recognition. In 1987, Teng Mah Seng was awarded Cultural Medallion from Singaporean government. The leadership then was continued by Teng Hong Hai in 1994.

Today, beside making musical events such as annual performances in Thian Hock Keng temple and the Chinese temple in Kusu Island, Siong Leng also regularly takes part in various contemporary music festivals in Singapore and abroad. The group also performed in their annual Multi-sensory Banquet with different and unique theme each year.

Performances and appearances
MAU: J-ASEAN Dance Collaboration, 2012.
Soul Journey – Cicada Zen, 2012.
Soul Journey – Nine Songs in Esplanade Theatre Studio, 2015.
Music of the South in Cheah Kongsi, Penang, 2015.
Getai Soul, 2016.
Family Fun Workshop in Singapore Heritage Festival, 2016.

Awards
Third prize for Solo in Llangollen International Musical Eisteddfod, Wales, 1983.
Fourth prize for ensemble in Llangollen International Musical Eisteddfod, Wales, 1983.
Cultural Medallion from Singaporean government awarded to Teng Mah Seng, 1987.
First prize in Llangollen International Musical Eisteddfod 2010 with new composition by Teng Mah Seng, "Facets of Life".

Publication
The Complete Book of Great Nanyin Melodies (three volumes) by Teng Mah Seng.
New Nanyin Songs: A Selection of Compositions by Teng Mah Seng.

Links
Official website of Siong Leng Musical Association
Nan Yin Performance by Siong Leng Musical Association
Traditional Art of Nanyin
Interview with a member of Siong Leng

References

Singaporean musical groups
1941 establishments in Singapore
Musical groups established in 1941
Chinese musical instrument ensembles
Chinese-Singaporean culture
Chinese Singaporean organisations